65th ACE Eddie Awards
January 30, 2015

Feature Film (Dramatic): 
Boyhood

Feature Film (Comedy or Musical): 
The Grand Budapest Hotel

The 65th American Cinema Editors Eddie Awards was presented on January 30, 2015 at the Beverly Hilton Hotel, honoring the best editors in films and television.

Winners and nominees

Film 
Best Edited Feature Film – Dramatic:

Sandra Adair – Boyhood
 Joel Cox and Gary Roach – American Sniper
 Kirk Baxter  – Gone Girl
 William Goldenberg – The Imitation Game
 John Gilroy – Nightcrawler
 Tom Cross – Whiplash
Best Edited Feature Film – Comedy or Musical:

Barney Pilling – The Grand Budapest Hotel
 Douglas Crise and Stephen Mirrione – Birdman
 Fred Raskin, Hughes Winborne and Craig Wood – Guardians of the Galaxy
 Wyatt Smith – Into the Woods
 Leslie Jones – Inherent Vice
Best Edited Animated Feature Film:

David Burrows and Chris McKay – The Lego Movie
 Tim Mertens – Big Hero 6
 Edie Bleiman – The Boxtrolls
Best Edited Documentary Feature:

Mathilde Bonnefoy – Citizenfour
 Aaron Wickenden – Finding Vivian Maier
 Elisa Bonora – Glen Campbell: I'll Be Me

Television 
Best Edited Half-Hour Series for Television:

Anthony Boys – Veep: "Special Relationship"
 Brian Merken and Tom Roche – Silicon Valley: "Optimal Tip-to-Tip Efficiency"
 Catherine Haight – Transparent: "Pilot"
Best Edited One Hour Series for Commercial Television:

Yan Miles – Sherlock: "His Last Vow"
 Scott Powell – 24: Live Another Day: "10:00 p.m. – 11:00 a.m."
 Scott Vickrey – The Good Wife: "A Few Words"
 Christopher Gay – Mad Men: "Waterloo"
 Elena Maganini and Michael Ornstein – Madam Secretary: "Pilot"
Best Edited One Hour Series for Non-Commercial Television:

Affonso Goncalves – True Detective: "Who Goes There"
 Byron Smith – House of Cards: "Chapter 14"
 Alex Hall – True Detective: "The Secret Fate of All Life"
Best Edited Mini-Series or Motion Picture for Television:

Adam Penn – The Normal Heart
 Regis Kimble – Fargo: "Buridan's Ass"
 Jeffrey M. Werner – Olive Kitteridge: "A Different Road"
Best Edited Non-Scripted Series

Hunter Gross – Anthony Bourdain: Parts Unknown: "Iran"
 Josh Earl and Johnny Bishop – Deadliest Catch: "Lost at Sea"
 Joe Langford & Nick Carew – Vice: "Greenland Is Melting & Bonded Labor"

Golden Eddie Filmmaker of the Year Award 
 Frank Marshall

Career Achievement Award 
 Diane Adler
 Gerald B. Greenberg

References

External links

65
2015 film awards
2015 guild awards
2015 in American cinema